Kino's Storytime, also known as Storytime, is an American children's reading television program which aired on PBS from October 12, 1992 until September 1, 1997. It was produced by KCET in Los Angeles, California. It was available on VHS from Strand Home Video and Video Treasures. It was co-hosted by Anne Betancourt as Lucy, Marabina Jaimes as Mara and Kino, voiced and performed by puppeteer Mark Ritts.

Cast
In addition to being co-hosted by Lucy, Mara and Kino, celebrity guest stars would sometimes visit the series and read stories, including:

 Tatyana Ali
 Jason Alexander
 Tim Allen
 María Conchita Alonso
 Jeff Altman
 Ed Asner
 John Astin
 René Auberjonois
 James Avery
 Barbara Bain
 Joanie Bartels
 Angela Bassett
 Shari Belafonte
 Valerie Bertinelli
 Mayim Bialik
 Rubén Blades
 Wilford Brimley
 Zachery Ty Bryan
 Brett Butler
 Gabriel Byrne
 Joanna Cassidy
 Peter Catalanotto
 Rosalind Chao
 Larry Cansler
 Diana Canova
 Barry Corbin
 Dave Coulier
 Jamie Lee Curtis
 Geena Davis
 Ellen DeGeneres
 Kim Delaney
 Suzanne Ciani
 Laura Dern
 Paul Dooley
 Michael Dorn
 Julia Duffy
 Kirsten Dunst
 Charles S. Dutton
 James Eckhouse
 Héctor Elizondo
 Ellaraino
 Elena Epps
 Jamie Farr
 Freddy Fender
 Janeane Garofalo
 Teri Garr
 Peri Gilpin
 John Goodman
 G. LeRoi Gray
 Robert Guillaume
 Steve Guttenberg
 Alaina Reed Hall
 Bob Harrison
 Melissa Joan Hart
 Dennis Haskins
 Salma Hayek
 Mariel Hemingway
 Christopher Hewett
 Telma Hopkins
 Michael Horse
 David Howard
 Janet Hubert
 Michael Jeter
 Arte Johnson
 Vicki Juditz
 Boney James
 Kim Karnsrithong
 David Keith
 Rae'Ven Kelly
 Leah Komaiko
 Joey Lawrence
 Sharon Lawrence
 Cloris Leachman
 Shari Lewis
 Gary "Litefoot" Davis
 Mario Lopez
 Ronn Lucas
 Tina Majorino
 Joseph Marcell
 Bill Martin, Jr.
 A Martinez
 James McDaniel
 Alley Mills
 Belita Moreno
 Tia and Tamera Mowry
  Pastor Arnold Murray
 Kathy Najimy
 Denise Nicholas
 Edward James Olmos
 Tom Paxton
 Felton Perry
 Cara Pifko
 Amanda Plummer
 Patricia Polacco
 Annie Potts
 Paula Poundstone
 Kathleen Quinlan
 Markus Redmond
 Alaina Reed Hall
 Little Richard
 Patricia Richardson
 John Ritter
 Paul Rodriguez
 Marion Ross
 Victoria Rowell
 Holly Russell
 Theresa Saldana
 Fred Savage
 Tom Selleck
 Jane Seymour
 Madge Sinclair
 Wes Studi
 Patrick Swayze
 Raven-Symoné
 Lina Santiago
 Katherine Thomerson
 Tamlyn Tomita
 Liz Torres
 Glynn Turman
 Reginald VelJohnson
 Jamie Walters
 Sunni Walton
 Malcolm-Jamal Warner
 Gedde Watanabe
 Carl Weintraub
 Ming-Na Wen
 Cindy Williams
 Kellie Shanygne Williams
 Lois Williams
 Mara Wilson
 Paul Winfield
 Diane Wolkstein
 Don and Audrey Wood
 Elijah Wood
 Alfre Woodard
 Ping Wu

Episodes

Season 1 (1992–1994)
 Books Read: Anna and the Little Green Dragon by Klaus Baumgart; The Little Polar Bear by Hans de Beer; Rose Meets Mr. Wintergarten by Bob Graham
 Books Read: Chicka Chicka Boom Boom by Bill Martin, Jr. and John Archambault, illustrated by Lois Ehlert; Chicken Sunday by Patricia Polacco; Any Kind of Dog by Lynn Reiser
 Books Read: The Relatives Came by Cynthia Rylant, illustrated by Stephen Gammell; Five Bad Boys, Billy Que and the Dustdobbin by Susan Patron, pictures by Mike Shenon; Mama, Do You Love Me? by Barbara Joosse, illustrated by Barbara Lavallee
 Books Read: The Old Ladies Who Liked Cats by Carol Greene, pictures by Loretta Krupinski; Alistair's Elephant by Marilyn Sadler, illustrated by Roger Bollen; Ira Sleeps Over by Bernard Waber
 Books Read: My Little Red Car by Chris Demarest; Three Wishes by Lucille Clifton, illustrated by Michael Hays; The Magic House by Robyn H. Eversole, illustrated by Peter Palagonia; Monster Mama by Liz Rosenberg, illustrations by Stephen Gammell
 Books Read: The Gingerbread Man retold by Eric Kimmel, illustrated by Megan Lloyd; The Very Quiet Cricket by Eric Carle; Whistle for Willie by Ezra Jack Keats
 Books Read: Mouse's Birthday by Jane Yolen, illustrated by Bruce Degen; Jonathan and His Mommy by Irene Hector-Smalls, illustrated by Michael Hays; The Story of Ferdinand by Munro Leaf, illustrated by Robert Lawson; Wilfrid Gordon McDonald Partridge by Mem Fox, illustrated by Julie Vivas
 Books Read: Owl Babies by Martin Waddell, illustrated by Patrick Benson; Two of Everything by Lily Toy Hong; A Mother for Choco by Keiko Kasza
 Books Read: Timothy Goes to School by Rosemary Wells; Amazing Grace by Mary Hoffman, pictures by Caroline Binch; Rumpelstiltskin retold and illustrated by Paul O. Zelinsky; On the Edge of the Sea by Betty Paraskevas, illustrated by Michael Paraskevas
 Books Read: The Happy Day by Ruth Krauss, pictures by Marc Simont; Maggie and the Pirate by Ezra Jack Keats; Cuddly Dudley by Jez Alborough
 Books Read: That's Good! That's Bad! by Margery Cuyler, pictures by David Catrow; Horton Hatches the Egg by Dr. Seuss
 Books Read: If You Give a Mouse a Cookie by Laura Joffe Numeroff, illustrated by Felicia Bond; Lady Bugatti by Joyce Maxner, illustrated by Kevin Hawkes; Little Peep by Jack Kent
 Books Read: The Fish Who Could Wish by John Bush, illustrated by Korky Paul; Green Wilma by Tedd Arnold; Magic Spring by Nami Rhee; Stina by Lena Anderson
 Books Read: The Boy with Square Eyes by Juliet and Charles Snape; Franklin in the Dark by Paulette Bourgeois, illustrated by Brenda Clark; The Rough-Face Girl by Rafe Martin, illustrated by David Shannon
 Books Read: Two Badd Babies by Jeffie Ross Gordon, illustrated by Chris Demarest; Go Away, Big Green Monster! by Ed Emberley; The Amazing Bone by William Steig
 Books Read: Froggy Gets Dressed by Jonathan London, illustrated by Frank Remkiewicz; Ghost's Hour, Spook's Hour by Eve Bunting, illustrated by Donald Carrick; Daley B by Jon Blake, illustrated by Axel Scheffler
 Books Read: The Trouble with Mom by Babette Cole; The Dragon of an Ordinary Family by Margaret Mahy, pictures by Helen Oxenbury; Borreguita and the Coyote by Verna Aardema, illustrated by Petra Mathers
 Books Read: Possum Come A-Knockin' by Nancy Van Laan, illustrated by George Booth; Elmer the Patchwork Elephant by David McKee; Abuela by Arthur Dorros, illustrated by Elisa Kleven; The Hungry Thing by Jan Slepian and Ann Seidler, pictures by Richard Martin
 Books Read: Winnie the Witch by Valerie Thomas, illustrated by Korky Paul; The Last Time I Saw Harris by Frank Remkiewicz; Eddie and Teddy by Gus Clarke; One of Three by Angela Johnson, pictures by David Soman
 Books Read: More, More, More Said the Baby by Vera Williams; Babushka's Doll by Patricia Polacco; Grandpa's Face by Eloise Greenfield, illustrated by Floyd Cooper
 Books Read: Jamberry by Bruce Degen; The Ghost-Eye Tree by Bill Martin, Jr. and John Archambault, illustrated by Ted Rand; Baby Rattlesnake told by Te Ata, adapted by Lynn Moroney, illustrated by Veg Reisberg
 Books Read: Night Tree by Eve Bunting, illustrated by Ted Rand; Maebelle's Suitcase by Tricia Tusa; Ruby the Copycat by Peggy Rathmann
 Books Read: The Wolf's Chicken Stew by Keiko Kasza; The Emperor's New Clothes retold and illustrated by S.T. Mendelson; Duckat by Gaelyn Gordon, illustrated by Chris Gaskin
 Books Read: The Treasure by Uri Shulevitz; Julius, the Baby of the World by Kevin Henkes; The Happy Hedgehog Band by Martin Waddell, illustrated by Jill Barton
 Books Read: Greetings from Sandy Beach by Bob Graham; Socrates by Rascal and Gert Bogaerts; The Rooster Who Went to His Uncle's Wedding by Alma Flor Ada, illustrated by Kathleen Kuchera
 Books Read: Aunt Isabel Tells a Good One by Kate Duke; Sometimes I Like to Be Alone by Heidi Goennel; Morris' Disappearing Bag by Rosemary Wells
 Books Read: Farmer Duck by Martin Waddell, illustrated by Helen Oxenbury; I Hear a Noise by Diane Goode; The Fortune-Tellers by Lloyd Alexander, illustrated by Trina Schart Hyman
 Books Read: Noisy Nora by Rosemary Wells; Rolling Rose by James Stevenson; Effie by Beverley Allinson, illustrations by Barbara Reid
 Books Read: The Folks in the Valley by Jim Aylesworth, illustrated by Stefano Vitale; The Banza by Diane Wolkstein, pictures by Marc Brown; Rosie's Baby Tooth by Maryann MacDonald, illustrated by Melissa Sweet
 Books Read: Company's Coming by Arthur Yorinks, illustrated by David Small; The Little Red Hen by Paul Galdone; Engelbert the Elephant by Tom Paxton, illustrated by Steven Kellogg
 Books Read: All Pigs Are Beautiful by Dick King-Smith, illustrated by Anita Jeram; The Itsy Bitsy Spider by Iza Trapani; Do Not Open by Brinton Turkle
 Books Read: The Woman Who Outshone the Sun from a poem by Alejandro Cruz Martinez, pictures by Fernando Olivera; The Art Lesson by Tomie dePaola; Gorilla by Anthony Browne
 Books Read: The Adventures of Taxi Dog by Debra and Sal Barracca, pictures by Mark Buehner; Clean Your Room, Harvey Moon! by Pat Cummings; The Baby Blue Cat Who Said No by Ainslie Pryor; Dear Mr. Blueberry by Simon James
 Books Read: The Winter Wedding by Robert Welber, illustrated by Deborah Kogan Ray; Broderick by Edward Ormondroyd, illustrated by John Larrecq; The Doorbell Rang by Pat Hutchins
 Books Read: The Erie Canal from Sea to Shining Sea; The Mitten adapted and illustrated by Jan Brett; Earl's Too Cool for Me by Leah Komaiko, illustrated by Laura Cornell; Annie Bananie by Leah Komaiko, illustrated by Laura Cornell; Slither McCreep and His Brother, Joe by Tony Johnston, illustrated by Victoria Chess
 Books Read: My Little Brother by Debi Gliori; Dinner at the Panda Palace by Stephanie Calmenson, illustrated by Nadine Bernard Westcott; Chrysanthemum by Kevin Henkes
 Books Read: Aunt Bernice by Jack Gantos, illustrated by Nicole Rubel; The Cat Who Lost His Purr by Michele Coxon; Goldilocks and the Three Bears retold and illustrated by Jan Brett
 Books Read: A Big Fat Enormous Lie by Marjorie Weinman Sharmat, illustrated by David McPhail; Mouse in House by Judith Schermer; Not So Fast, Songololo by Niki Daly
 Books Read: Ming Lo Moves the Mountain by Arnold Lobel; The Boy and the Ghost by Robert San Souci, illustrated by Brian Pinkney; Life is Fun by Nancy Carlson
 Books Read: Princess Smartypants by Babette Cole; "Stand Back," Said the Elephant, "I'm Going to Sneeze!" by Patricia Thomas, pictures by Wallace Tripp; A Special Trade by Sally Wittman, pictures by Karen Gundersheimer
SPECIAL: Mucky Moose by Jonathan Allen; Alistair's Elephant by Marilyn Sadler, illustrated by Roger Bollen; When I Was Little by Jamie Lee Curtis, illustrated by Laura Cornell

Season 2 (1995)
 Books Read: The Three Little Wolves and the Big Bad Pig by Eugene Trivizas, illustrated by Helen Oxenbury; The True Story of the Three Little Pigs by A. Wolf as told to Jon Scieszka, illustrated by Lane Smith
 Books Read: Regina's Big Mistake by Marissa Moss; The Empty Pot by Demi; Wind Says Good Night by Katy Rydell, illustrated by David Jorgensen
 Books Read: The Tiny Patient by Judy Pedersen; Little Lumpty by Miko Imai; The Grasshopper and the Ants retold by Margaret Wise Brown, illustrated by Larry Moore
 Books Read: Going Home by Margaret Wild, illustrated by Wayne Harris; The Tickleoctopus by Audrey Wood, illustrated by Don Wood; The Grumpalump by Sarah Hayes, illustrated by Barbara Firth
 Books Read: Subway Sparrow by Leyla Torres; King Bidgood's in the Bathtub by Audrey Wood, illustrated by Don Wood; Bert and Barney by Ned Delaney
 Books Read: A Hat for Minerva Louise by Janet Morgan Stoeke; Sam's No Dummy, Farmer Goff by Brian Schatell; Dogteam by Gary Paulsen, illustrated by Ruth Wright Paulsen; Prize in the Snow by Bill Easterling, illustrations by Mary Beth Owens
 Books Read: A Bear for Christmas by Holly Keller; Pip's Magic by Ellen Stoll Walsh; Cabbage Rose by M.C. Helldorfer, illustrated by Julie Downing
 Books Read: Stop That Pickle! by Peter Armour, illustrated by Andrew Shachat; Swamp Angel by Anne Isaacs, illustrated by Paul O. Zelinsky
 Books Read: The Whales' Song by Dyan Sheldon, paintings by Gary Blythe; The Paper Princess by Elisa Kleven; My Grandma Leonie by Bijou Le Tord
 Books Read: Sheila Rae, the Brave by Kevin Henkes; The Rat and the Tiger by Keiko Kasza; A House is a House for Me by Mary Ann Hoberman, illustrated by Betty Fraser
 Books Read: Too Many Tamales by Gary Soto, illustrated by Ed Martinez; La Gallinita Roja by Margot Zemach; ¿Donde Esta Mi Osito? by Jez Alborough - Christmas Special
 Books Read: Flower Garden by Eve Bunting, illustrated by Kathryn Hewitt; When the Fly Flew In... by Lisa Westberg Peters, pictures by Brad Sneed; Nathaniel Willy, Scared Silly by Judith Mathews and Fay Robinson, illustrations by Alexi Natchev
 Books Read: Would You Rather... by John Burningham; Pigs Aplenty, Pigs Galore! by David McPhail; Boodil, My Dog by Pija Lindenbaum
 Books Read: Frog Went A-Courtin' retold by John Langstaff, pictures by Feodor Rojankovsky; Uncle Jed's Barbershop by Margaree King Mitchell, illustrated by James Ransome; Stories to Tell from Meet Danitra Brown by Nikki Grimes, illustrated by Floyd Cooper
 Books Read: Playing Right Field by Willy Welch, illustrated by Marc Simont; Pug, Slug, and Doug the Thug by Carol Saller, illustrations by Vicki Jo Redenbaugh; Hunting the White Cow by Tres Seymour, pictures by Wendy Anderson Halperin
 Books Read: Donna O'Neeshuck Was Chased By Some Cows by Bill Grossman, illustrated by Sue Truesdell; Don't Fidget a Feather! by Erica Silverman, illustrated by S.D. Schindler; Nothing at All by Denys Cazet
 Books Read: A Fairy Went A-Marketing by Rose Fyleman, illustrated by Jamichael Henterly; Boats that float by Rita Golden Gelman and Susan Kovacs Buxbaum, illustrated by Marilyn MacGregor; Mole's Hill by Lois Ehlert
 Books Read: Bear by John Schoenherr; The Hunter by Paul Geraghty; It's the Bear! by Jez Alborough
 Books Read: Hi! by Ann Herbert Scott, illustrated by Glo Coalson; Fire by Gail Kay Haines, pictures by Jacqueline Chwast; Amber on the Mountain by Tony Johnston, paintings by Robert Duncan
 Books Read: Owl Eyes by Frieda Gates, illustrated by Yoshi Miyake; Tops and Bottoms adapted and illustrated by Janet Stevens
 Books Read: Miss Spider's Tea Party by David Kirk; Elvira by Margaret Shannon; Wilson Sat Alone by Debra Hess, illustrated by Diane Greenseid; Little Nino's Pizzeria by Karen Barbour

Season 3 (1996–1997)
 Books Read: The House That Drac Built by Judy Sierra, illustrated by Will Hillenbrand; Big Pumpkin by Erica Silverman, illustrated by S.D. Schindler; The Little Old Lady Who Was Not Afraid of Anything by Linda Williams, illustrated by Megan Lloyd; A Number of Dragons by Loreen Leedy - Halloween Special
 Books Read: Is Your Mama a Llama? by Deborah Guarino, illustrated by Steven Kellogg; Storm Boy by Paul Owen Lewis; The Monkey and the Crocodile by Paul Galdone
 Books Read: My Mama Had a Dancing Heart by Libba Moore Gray, illustrated by Raul Colon; Mirette on the High Wire by Emily Arnold McCully; Twist with a Burger, Jitter with a Bug by Linda Lowery, pictures by Pat Dypold
 Books Read: Suddenly! by Colin McNaughton; Courtney by John Burningham; Margie and Me by Beverly Wirth, illustrated by Karen Ann Weinhaus
 Books Read: Contrary Mary by Anita Jeram; The Perfect Orange by Frank Araujo, PhD, illustrations by Xiao Jun Li; Max and Diana and the Beach Day by Harriet Ziefert, drawings by Lonni Sue Johnson
 Books Read: Babushka Baba Yaga by Patricia Polacco; The Old Dog by Charlotte Zolotow, paintings by James Ransome; The Painter by Peter Catalanotto
 Books Read: Jessica by Kevin Henkes; I'm Coming to Get You! by Tony Ross; Listen, Buddy by Helen Lester, illustrated by Lynn Munsinger
 Books Read: Buz by Richard Egielski; A Flea in the Ear by Stephen Wyllie, illustrated by Ken Brown; If... by Sarah Perry; "Hey Bug" by Lilian Moore from Sunflakes: Poems for Children; "Song of the Bugs" by Margaret Wise Brown from Nibble, Nibble: Poems for Children
 Books Read: The Little Mouse, The Red Ripe Strawberry, and the Big Hungry Bear by Don and Audrey Wood; The Leopard's Drum by Jessica Souhami; A Jewish Holiday ABC by Malka Drucker, illustrated by Rita Pocock
 Books Read: 'Twas the Night Before Thanksgiving by Dav Pilkey; How Many Days to America? by Eve Bunting, illustrated by Beth Peck; Over the River and Through the Wood by Lydia Maria Child, pictures by Nadine Bernard Westcott - Thanksgiving Special
 Books Read: The Old, Old Man and the Very Little Boy by Kristine Franklin, illustrated by Terea Shaffer; More Than Anything Else by Marie Bradby, pictures by Chris Soentpiet; Knoxville, Tennessee by Nikki Giovanni, illustrated by Larry Johnson
 Books Read: Lilly's Purple Plastic Purse by Kevin Henkes; Hotel Animal by Keith DuQuette
 Books Read: What is the Sun? by Reeve Lindbergh, illustrated by Stephen Lambert; Sally and the Limpet by Simon James; A Crow Named Joe by Peter Eyvindson, illustrated by Doug Keith; What a Wonderful World by George David Weiss and Bob Thiele, illustrated by Ashley Bryan
 Books Read: Turnip Soup by Lynne Born Myers and Christopher Myers, illustrated by Katie Keller; Tiny for a Day by Dick Gackenbach; Night in the Barn by Faye Gibbons, illustrated by Erick Ingraham
 Books Read: Truck Song by Diane Siebert, pictures by Byron Barton; The Ghost of Nicholas Greebe by Tony Johnston, pictures by S.D. Schindler; The Wide-Mouthed Frog by Keith Faulkner, illustrated by Jonathan Lambert
 Books Read: This is Our House by Michael Rosen, illustrated by Bob Graham; Tacky the Penguin by Helen Lester, illustrated by Lynn Munsinger; The Most Beautiful Kid in the World by Jennifer Ericsson, pictures by Susan Meddaugh; From Bed to Bus by Juli Barbato, pictures by Brian Schatell
 Books Read: In the Rain with Baby Duck by Amy Hest, illustrated by Jill Barton; Goldfish Hide-and-Seek by Satoshi Kitamura; The Butterfly Seeds by Mary Watson
 Books Read: When I Was Five by Arthur Howard; The Paperboy by Dav Pilkey; Bodies by Barbara Brenner, photographs by George Ancona
 Books Read: Zin! Zin! Zin! A Violin by Lloyd Moss, illustrated by Marjorie Priceman; The Lion and the Little Red Bird by Elisa Kleven; The Way of the Willow Branch by Emery Bernhard, illustrated by Durga Bernhard
 Books Read: Grandma's Cat by Helen Ketteman, illustrated by Marsha Lynn Winborn; The Old Woman Who Named Things by Cynthia Rylant, illustrated by Kathryn Brown; Lost by Paul Brett Johnson and Celeste Lewis, illustrated by Paul Brett Johnson

VHS releases

References

External links
 
 Episode guide

1990s American children's television series
1992 American television series debuts
1997 American television series endings
American children's education television series
American television shows featuring puppetry
English-language education television programming
PBS Kids shows
PBS original programming
Reading and literacy television series
Television shows set in Los Angeles